The Presbyterian Church in Ireland (PCI; ; Ulster-Scots: Prisbytairin Kirk in Airlann) is the largest Presbyterian denomination in the Republic of Ireland, and the largest Protestant denomination in Northern Ireland. Like most Christian churches in Ireland, it is organised on an all-island basis, in both Northern Ireland and the Republic of Ireland. The church has approximately 210,000 members.

Membership 
The Church has a membership of approximately 210,000 people in 534 congregations in 403 charges across both Northern Ireland and the Republic of Ireland. About 96% of the membership is in Northern Ireland. It is the second-largest church in Northern Ireland after the Catholic Church, and the second-largest Protestant denomination in the Irish Republic, after the Church of Ireland. All the congregations of the church are represented up to the General Assembly (the church's government).

History 
Presbyterianism in Ireland dates from the time of the Plantation of Ulster in 1610. During the reign of James VI of Scotland, a large number of Scottish Presbyterians emigrated to Ireland, chiefly to Ulster. The first move away from the Church of Scotland, of which the Presbyterians in Ireland were part, saw the creation of the Presbytery of Ulster in 1642 by chaplains of a Scottish Covenanter army which had arrived to protect the mostly Protestant British (Scottish and English) settlers in Ulster and to crush the Irish Rebellion of 1641 threatening these settlers. It succeeded in protecting the settlers but failed abysmally to crush the rebellion. Under the more secure protection of Cromwell congregations multiplied and new presbyteries were formed.  However, after the Restoration, nonconforming ministers were removed from parishes of the Established Church, but no matter the opinions of the king on religion, the Irish administration could not afford to alienate such a substantial Protestant population and Presbyterianism was allowed to continue in the country, with the stipends of ministers paid through the  – literally 'the King's gift'.

From the 1690s, Presbyterian congregations, now organised in the Synod of Ulster, enjoyed practical freedom of religion, confirmed by the Toleration Act of 1719. However, their members remained very conscious both of continuing legal disabilities under the penal laws and of economic hardship as many were tenant farmers and objected to the payment of tithes to support the Church of Ireland. Throughout the eighteenth century, many Presbyterians were involved in movements for reform which, carried by enthusiasm for the American and French revolutions, culminated with their prominent involvement in the United Irishmen. Among the ordained ministers publicly associated with the republican society were Thomas Ledlie Birch, William Steel Dickson, William Porter, William Sinclair and David Bailie Warden.

The eighteenth century saw significant tensions within the Synod of Ulster, which was divided between the Old Lights and the New Lights.  The Old Lights were conservative Calvinists who believed that ministers and ordinands should subscribe to the Westminster Confession of Faith.  The New Lights were more liberal and were unhappy with the Westminster Confession and did not require ministers to subscribe to it.  The New Lights dominated the Synod of Ulster during the eighteenth century, allowing the more conservative Scottish Presbyterian dissenters, Seceders and Covenanters to establish a strong presence in Ulster.

In the nineteenth century, a belief that some of those who did not subscribe to the Westminster Confession were in fact Arian provoked a new phase of the conflict. This ended when seventeen ministers opposed to subscription seceded with their congregations to form the Remonstrant Synod.  This led to the restoration of obligatory subscription to the Westminster Confession within the Synod of Ulster and facilitated union with the Seceders in 1840 to create the General Assembly of the Presbyterian Church in Ireland, whose first moderator was Samuel Hanna. The united church was active in missionary activity both at home and abroad, particularly benefitting from the evangelical Ulster Revival of 1859.

Moderators
List of Moderators of the Presbyterian Church in Ireland

The Church today 

The headquarters of the church are at Assembly Buildings, Fisherwick Place, Belfast, which were extensively renovated as part of a multimillion-pound project in 2010–2012. The Presbyterian Church in Ireland, a founding member of the World Alliance of Reformed Churches, has 537 congregations in 19 presbyteries across Ireland. The church's two nineteenth-century theological colleges, Magee College (Derry) and Assembly's College (Belfast), merged in 1978 to form Union Theological College in Belfast. Union offers post-graduate education to the denomination's candidates for the full-time ministry.

Until 2007 the church was connected to a credit union, Presbyterian Mutual, that collapsed with the savings of almost 10,000 members, almost all of whom were also members of the church.

The PCI is involved in education, evangelism, social service and mission in a number of areas around the world:

India
China (see also: Irish Presbyterian Mission)
The Middle East
Jamaica
Africa
Indonesia
Nepal
Brazil
Portugal

Church and worship

Meeting house
Apart from the seats for worshippers, the inside of a Presbyterian church building (often called the meeting house) is dominated by four items of furniture.

The Pulpit is the place from which sermons are preached.  It generally occupies the central place in the church, reflecting the central place of the proclamation of the Word of God in the worship of the Church.
The Lectern, or Bible Stand, holds the Bible in a prominent place in the church. The Bible is the source of all authority in the life of the church.
The Communion Table is often placed directly in front of the pulpit.  The associated chairs are occupied by the minister and elders during the service of Holy Communion.
The Baptismal Font is used during baptisms.

Service
Presbyterianism is confessionally tied to what is known as the 'regulative principle of worship' which teaches that only that which is commanded in scripture should be done in worship. According to chapter 21 of the Westminster Confession of Faith a service of worship includes, reading the bible, a sermon on a selected passage or passages, (this being the central element in the Presbyterian Church's services), along with prayer and singing. The order all these things take place in the service varies from congregation to congregation.
 
In recent years, the singing of hymns has almost exclusively taken over from what was usual in the past, which was the singing of psalms and paraphrases.  At the turn of the last century, many Irish presbyterian congregations also moved from singing without being accompanied by musical instruments to the use of them and now most if not all Presbyterian churches use a variety of instruments but nearly always a piano or guitar, many still have a traditional organ as well.

Along with these aspects, many churches will also have a section of public announcements, a time to give money to the church, and often, a talk designed especially for children. Other elements found less regularly are, a time of explicit doctrinal teaching using one of the church's two catechisms or confession of faith, the celebration of one or both of the churches two sacraments baptism and the Lord's supper, an interview of some person in a Parachurch organization or who does some role in the church, usually for free but sometimes paid, a vow ceremony whereby teenagers or adults become communicant members and very rarely ordinations of elders or ministers.

Logo and motto

The motto of the Presbyterian Church in Ireland is "Ardens sed Virens" – "burning but flourishing". It is usually seen alongside the Burning Bush, the church's symbol. A burning bush was included in the more modern logo (top).

According to the Bible, in Exodus 3:2, Moses heard the voice of God coming from a burning bush that was not consumed by fire. This occurred after he had to flee Egypt, and was when he was called to go and demand the release of the Israelites.

Social issues
The Presbyterian Church is active in social issues, and is conservative in regards to LGBT rights and abortion.

The church ordains women as ruling elders and ministers of word and sacrament.

On life issues, the denomination opposes abortion except for when the woman's life is in danger, and holds "total opposition" to the liberalisation of Northern Ireland's abortion laws. The denomination quoted itself as being "deeply disappointed" at the passing of the Northern Ireland (Executive Formation) Act 2019.

In 2021 the General Assembly agreed to ‘…direct the Trustees to employ a 'divest and engage' strategy in relation to companies producing or using fossil fuels, thereby divesting from those that derive more that 10% of their turnover from oil and gas extraction (the coal, oil and gas majors), and engaging with companies that derive more than 10% of their turnover from the use of fossil fuels encouraging them to make clear commitments to the targets for global heating and carbon emission reduction as set out in the COP 21 Paris Agreement; reporting back to the 2022 General Assembly.'

On the issue of dealing with the legacy of the Troubles, the Church's Council for Public Affairs has commented on "the right of victims and survivors to seek due process and justice in the courts. The Council’s report expressed its 'deep disquiet at the current proposals' stating that, 'whilst the Stormont House Agreement (SHA) was not perfect, it did set out a broader, four-strand framework to address legacy issues. We are on public record stating our support for all four key principles outlined in the SHA, especially the right of victims and survivors to seek due process and justice in the courts."

The Church is active in social work and provides services to those with addictions and offending behaviours, and who require supported housing through specialist facilities.

Along with the other major Protestant denominations (Church of Ireland and Methodist Church in Ireland), the Church is heavily involved in education. The three denominations nominate over 1,800 governors to serve on the boards of controlled schools in Northern Ireland. Controlled schools are 'church-related schools' because in the 1930s, 40s and 50s, the Protestant Churches transferred their school buildings, pupils and staff into state control (hence the terms 'transferor' and 'controlled') on the understanding that the Christian ethos of these schools would be maintained in perpetuity.

Views on LGBT rights 

In May 2006, the church's press officer stated that current regulations did not prohibit blessing same-sex relationships. However, in June 2006, the General Assembly (GA) voted to ban its ministers from blessing same-gender relationships, clarifying the previous ambiguity. In 2015, the church voiced its opposition to the legalisation of same-sex marriage.

In June 2018, the General Assembly held a debate "the specific theological question of what constitutes a credible profession of faith and how it is to be understood and applied in [the] particular pastoral circumstances" of same-sex couples. The report from the Doctrine Committee stated,"In light of our understanding of Scripture and the Church’s understanding of a credible profession of faith, it is clear that same sex couples are not eligible for communicant membership, nor are they qualified to receive baptism for their children. We believe that their outward conduct and lifestyle is at variance with a life of obedience to Christ."The Assembly subsequently agreed with this report, and voted 'That appropriate training be offered to Kirk Sessions on the theology and practice of the Church's understanding of 'a credible profession of faith' and the pastoral guidelines on homosexuality.'

The outcome of this debate was controversial among the church's members, and several ministers spoke out against the adoption of any formal rules. It also led to several resignations; notable Presbyterian elder, Lord Alderdice, announced his resignation in protest, and later wrote a book on the subject of tolerance. When a minister of Whitehead Presbyterian, Ian Carton, resigned three years later, he partially attributed his decision to the 2018 decision of the General Assembly. An open letter was published by newspapers from 232 members of the church, including many ministers, elders, and one former Moderator of the Church Assembly, entitled "A Cry from the Heart", addressing the "profound sense of hurt" the church had inflicted on its LGBT members.

In the same year, the church voted to loosen its ties with the Church of Scotland with a vote of 255 to 171, after that church took steps towards letting its ministers preside at same-sex marriages. This followed several years of the Assembly's decision to not have the Moderator attend the Church of Scotland's meetings, in protest of that church's steps towards liberalisation.

In September 2019 the church dismissed a Dublin-based elder, Steven Smyrl, after he had contracted a same-sex civil marriage in November 2018, citing that this was "not compatible" with the church's ordained leadership. This led to a bitter and divisive investigation, which in December 2021 found that the minister of Christ Church, Sandymount, Rev Katherine P. Meyer, had breached the Church’s laws and teachings on sexuality, had refused to recant her decision to support the elder, and that her church council had coopted the dismissed elder back onto its membership and then refused the Presbytery's demand to reverse that action. The response from the media and several congregations was highly critical, with an editorial in The Irish Times describing the church as being on "the road to irrelevance".

Publications
 The Presbyterian Herald, is the official magazine of the Presbyterian Church in Ireland founded in 1943
 The Missionary Herald of the Presbyterian Church in Ireland (1904 to 1946) incorporated into Presbyterian Herald
 The Witness, was a Presbyterian newspaper, published in Belfast (from 1874 to 1941)
 Irish Presbyterian, (1853-1858 and 1895–1942) incorporated into The Presbyterian Herald 
 The Banner of Ulster, was a twice-weekly Presbyterian newspaper published first on 10 June 1842 by William Gibson
 Young Men's Magazine, (1858-1859)
 The Presbyterian Penny Magazine, (1834-1837)
 The Orthodox Presbyterian, (1829-1840)
 The Covenanter, (1830-1843)
 The Bible Christian, (1830-1845)
 The Non-Subscriber, (1857-1863) re-founded as The Non-Subscribing Presbyterian in 1907 
 The Orthodox Presbyterian, (1829-1840)
 The Presbyterian Churchman, (1877-1894)

Bodies to which the PCI is affiliated
Irish Council of Churches
Community of Protestant Churches in Europe (Leuenberg Church Fellowship)
Conference of European Churches
World Communion of Reformed Churches

See also
Christianity in Ireland
Presbyterianism
Church of Scotland
Religion in the United Kingdom
Ulster-Scots
History of Christianity in Ireland

Other Presbyterian denominations in Ireland or Northern Ireland
Free Presbyterian Church of Ulster
Non-subscribing Presbyterian Church of Ireland
Reformed Presbyterian Church of Ireland
Evangelical Presbyterian Church

Notes

References

Further reading

External links
Presbyterian Church in Ireland
The Presbyterian Herald Online – Church Newspaper
pciyac.org – Website of the PCI Board of Youth & Children's Ministry
youth.ie
Mission in Ireland department online
Presbyterian Historical Society of Ireland

 
Presbyterian denominations in Europe
Reformed denominations in the United Kingdom
Presbyterianism in Northern Ireland
Presbyterianism in the Republic of Ireland
Religious organisations based in Ireland
Protestant denominations established in the 17th century
Protestantism in the United Kingdom